Tim Stanislaw Schreiber (born 24 April 2002) is a German professional footballer who plays as a goalkeeper for  club Holstein Kiel, on loan from RB Leipzig. He also represents the Germany under-20 team.

References

External links

2002 births
Living people
People from Freital
German footballers
Footballers from Saxony
Association football goalkeepers
Germany youth international footballers
RB Leipzig players
Hallescher FC players
Holstein Kiel players
3. Liga players